The 2015 Evolution Championship Series (commonly referred to as Evo 2015 or EVO 2015) was a fighting game event held in Las Vegas on July 17–19. The event featured a major tournament for nine fighting games, including the largest Super Smash Bros. tournament up to that point and a highly popular Ultra Street Fighter IV tournament. The Street Fighter IV tournament was won by Yusuke Momochi, defeating GamerBee in the Grand Finals.

Background
Evo 2015 was announced on January 20, 2015, on a livestream by event organizer Joey "Mr. Wizard" Cuellar and Twitch's Mike Ross to take place on July 17–19. The event was held at the ballrooms of the Bally's / Paris Las Vegas hotel and casino.

The event featured a total of US$300,000 in prize money, spread over nine major tournaments. Evo 2015 started on Friday morning, with the finals of five of the major tournaments taking place on Sunday. There were eight official livestream channels on Twitch dedicated to broadcasting the event, the Sunday finals being broadcast on Evo's primary Twitch channel.

Games
Evo 2015 featured a major tournament of nine fighting games:
Ultra Street Fighter IV
Ultimate Marvel vs. Capcom 3
Super Smash Bros. for Wii U
Guilty Gear Xrd -SIGN-
Killer Instinct
Mortal Kombat X
Persona 4 Arena Ultimax
Super Smash Bros. Melee
Tekken 7

Cuellar announced on June 1 that the Ultra Street Fighter IV tournament would be held on the Xbox 360 version of the game, rather than the PlayStation 4 port which possessed a large number of glitches, as well as severe input delay and visual stuttering. Evo 2015 was the final year that Ultra Street Fighter IV was played at the Evolution Championship Series, as Street Fighter V was released in February the following year. The full prize pool for the Street Fighter tournament was set on US$72,270. In late March 2015, Atlus announced that Persona 4 Arena Ultimax would use the technically outdated PlayStation 3 version of the game, as the Asians had an arcade-only balance patch exclusive to their region.

Responses
Shacknewss Ozzie Mejia described seven out of the nine games as "no-brainers", but stated that Ultimate Marvel vs. Capcom 3 and Super Smash Bros. Melee were surprise inclusions at the 2015 event. The former would be left unbalanced due to Marvel Comics having detracted their license, not allowing Capcom to patch the game. Melee, meanwhile, made a third consecutive Evo appearance despite Super Smash Bros. for Wii U being played on the tournament as well. The game has consistently been popular among the fighting game community since its release in 2001.

King of Fighters XIII was surprisingly absent of the roster in 2015, and both Shacknews and Destructoid noted the lack of BlazBlue after Evo 2014's "legendary" Grand Final as a disappointment. Meanwhile, Evo 2015 was the global tournament debut of Tekken 7.

Participants
Ultra Street Fighter IV was the most popular tournament at Evo 2015, featuring 2,227 registered players. Killer Instinct saw the least registered players at the event, with only 397 participants. Evo 2015 was the largest Super Smash Bros. tournament up until that point, 1,926 players having registered for the Wii U version of the game and 1,869 players registering for Melee, compared with 970 competitors in the Melee tournament of Evo 2014. According to Cuellar, both Super Smash Bros. games had over a thousand registrants within a month of announcement.

Evo 2015 was attended by Jamie Lee Curtis, cosplaying as Vega. Bill Trinen was originally going to compete at the Super Smash Bros. for Wii U tournament, but cancelled at the last minute following former Nintendo president Satoru Iwata's death.

Tournament summary

Ultra Street Fighter IV

The finals of Ultra Street Fighter IV, held on Sunday, featured GamerBee and Eduardo "PR Balrog" Perez, despite both players already having announced their retirement and didn't expect to make the Top 8. Yusuke Momochi entered the Street Fighter finals after having won the Capcom Cup the previous year, though he did not have much success throughout the start of 2015. Other players in the finals included younger players NuckleDu and Fuudo. A new player, AiAi, surprisingly cracked the Top 8, despite having not a single Capcom Pro Tour tournament win in the 2015 season on his name. Shacknews reported that Infiltration played strong matches against Momochi and Gamerbee, playing with characters nobody knew he had any experience with. Though he lost both matches, they were described as "among the most suspenseful matches of the show."

The Grand Final was held between Yusuke Momochi starting out with Elena and GamerBee with Adon. Gamerbee, coming from loser's finals, managed to beat Momochi in their first game and cause a bracket reset. Momochi switched to Evil Ryu for their second game, a decision that paid off. However, during the second round of their second match, Momochi's arcade controller malfunctioned, as it lost its connection to the Xbox 360 on which the game was being played. As a sign of sportsmanship, GamerBee did not abuse the situation to build up his "Super Meter" for the next round, though Momochi was forced to forfeit the round by tournament rules. Evil Geniuses teammate and significant other Chocoblanka loaned Momochi her own arcade stick, allowing him to continue the match. Momochi managed to defeat Gamerbee during the last round, winning the tournament.

Super Smash Bros.
Despite its high registration count, the Super Smash Bros. for Wii U tournament was mostly ignored during Evo 2015, its finals wrapping up early on Saturday just as Capcom's Street Fighter V panel was being held. The tournament was won by ZeRo, dominating the tournament without a single loss.

The Super Smash Bros. Melee finals kicked off on Sunday after a high-quality montage video. The competition featured Mango, the two-time defending champion, losing to Hungrybox's Jigglypuff in the loser's bracket semi-finals. Hungrybox went on to face Armada's Fox in the Grand Finals, to whom he lost. Armada became the Melee champion, though Mango was given a standing ovation during the awards ceremony regardless as a sign of respect.

Other tournaments

Players Woshige and Ogawa faced off against one another during the winner's bracket semifinals of the Guilty Gear Xrd tournament. After Woshige scored his first knockout, he stood up and celebrated his win, despite not actually having won the whole match yet. This allowed Ogawa to easily beat up Woshige's character in the next round, and he went on to win the tournament.

Reveals
Capcom revealed their eighth confirmed playable character and first newcomer for their upcoming game Street Fighter V, Necalli on the Sunday finals. NetherRealm and Warner Bros. would showcase a trailer for their fourth Kombat Pack challenger, Tremor with a release date that was scheduled two days after EVO.

EVO 2015 was where Rising Thunder, an indie fighting game made by Radiant Entertainment (owned by the Cannon Brothers) would be announced. The game ended service on March 18, 2016 following the purchase of Radiant Entertainment by Riot Games.

Results

References

2015 fighting game tournaments
2015 in sports in Nevada
Evolution Championship Series
Sports competitions in the Las Vegas Valley